Kwacoco, sometimes spelled kwa-coco, is a Cameroonian cuisine dish consisting in pureed cocoyam (a root crop from in Central and South America) wrapped and steamed in banana leaves. It is consumed by different ethnic groups from Cameroon, specially the Kwe people, for whom the traditional meal usually consists in kwacoco served with banga, which is a soup made from a base of palm nut pulp, and smoked fish. It is sometimes referred to as kwacoco bible when the cocoyam is mixed with other ingredients such as spinach, smoked fish, red oil and spices, and it can also be served along with many other stews and soups.

The combination of kwacoco and banga is a staple food for rural communities in Cameroon, who rely on the fats and carbohydrates provided by these foods to subsist. During the world food crisis of 2008, local farmers were encouraged to produce more cocoyam, and urban consumers were told to promote its consumption over imported food.

See also

 List of steamed foods

References

Root vegetables
Steamed foods
Cameroonian cuisine